Carlos Guerrero may refer to:
 Carlos Guerrero (racing driver) (born 1957), Mexican racing driver
 Carlos Guerrero (sport shooter) (1891-?), Mexican sport shooter
 Carlos Guerrero (footballer) (born 2000), Mexican footballer
 Carlos Guerrero de Lizardi, Mexican professor and researcher in economics